The 2007–08 season in Swedish bandy, starting August 2007 and ending July 2008:

Honours

Official titles

Domestic results

2008 Elitserien play-offs 

Final

National team results 

Seasons in Swedish bandy
Bandy
Bandy
2007 in bandy
2008 in bandy